David Hodgson may refer to:

 David Hodgson (rugby league) (born 1981), English rugby league footballer
 David Hodgson (judge) (1939–2012), Australian judge
 David Hodgson (chemist), English chemistry professor
 David Hodgson (footballer) (born 1960), English football player
 David Hodgson (artist) (1798–1864), English painter
 Dave Hodgson (born 1959), English mayor of Bedford
 David Hodgson, convicted murderer, see murder of Jenny Nicholl